The 2005 Election Committee subsector by-elections were held on 1 May 2005 to fill the 33 vacancies in 17 subsectors of the Election Committee for electing the Hong Kong Chief Executive in the Chief Executive election in following March.

Background
Tung Chee Hwa had long been an unpopular Chief Executive, especially after the controversies over the Article 23 of the Hong Kong Basic Law which caused more than 500,000 people to march on 1 July 2003. Tung claimed his health was deteriorating early in 2005 and suddenly resigned on 10 March 2005 which triggered the election of the Chief Executive. The Election Committee by-elections were held to update the membership of the Election Committee, filling in the vacancies in the Election Committee. The pro-democracy camp, with Democratic Party's chairman Lee Wing-tat as the Chief Executive candidate, attempted to get over 100 nominations from the Election Committee to enter the race to prevent Donald Tsang being elected uncontested.

Vacancies
There were 33 vacancies in 17 subsectors in which 27 were from the regular subsectors and 6 from the Religious Subsector. Out of these 33 vacancies, 19 of them arose from members being dead, two from members having resigned from the Election Committee and 12 from members being deemed to have resigned from the Election Committee. Reasons for the 33 vacancies ascertained in 17 subsectors are as follows:
 Accountancy Subsector: two vacancies arose because two members, namely, Fan Sheung-tak and Fok Kwan-wing had died;
 Agriculture and Fisheries Subsector: two vacancies arose because two members, namely, Chan Chi-kong and Cheng For-yau had died; 
 Architectural, Surveying and Planning Subsector: one vacancy arose because a member, Patrick Lau Sau-shing having been elected as a legislative council member, was deemed to have resigned from the Election Committee on 8 October 2004; 
 Chinese People’s Political Consultative Conference Subsector: two vacancies arose because one member, Wong Ker-lee had died and another member, Lee Hon-chiu had resigned from the Election Committee; 
 Chinese Medicine Subsector: one vacancy arose because a member, namely, Poon Pak-sun had died; 
 Engineering Subsector: two vacancies arose because two members, namely, Kenneth Chan Nai-keong and Yim Chun-nam had died; 
 Finance Subsector: one vacancy arose because Lam Kwong-siu, having been elected as a National People’s Congress member, was deemed to have resigned from the Election Committee on 21 March 2003;
 Heung Yee Kuk Subsector: four vacancies arose because two members, namely, Pang Hang-yin and Ho Sun-kuen had died; and two other members, namely, Cheung Hok-ming and Lam Wai-keung, having been elected as Legislative Council members, were deemed to have resigned from the Election Committee on 8 October 2004; 
 Higher Education Subsector: one vacancy arose because a member, Leung Jin-pang had died; 
 Hong Kong and Kowloon District Councils Subsector: three vacancies arose because a member, Liang Tin had died; another two members, namely, Ko Po-ling, having been elected as a National People's Congress member, and Wong Kwok-hing, having been elected as a Legislative Council member, were deemed to have resigned from the EC on 21 March 2003 and 8 October 2004 respectively; 
 Import and Export Subsector: one vacancy arose because a member, Wong Ting-kwong, having been elected as a Legislative Council member, was deemed to have resigned from the EC on 8 October 2004; 
 Industrial (First) Subsector: two vacancies arose because two members, namely, Jeffrey Lam Kin-fung, and Andrew Leung Kwan-yuen, both having been elected as Legislative Council members, were deemed to have resigned from the Election Committee on 8 October 2004;
 Industrial (Second) Subsector: one vacancy arose because a member, Lam Hok-po had died; 
 Labour Subsector: one vacancy arose because a member, Wong Kwok-kin, having been elected as a National People's Congress member, was deemed to have resigned from the Election Committee on 21 March 2003;
 Legal Subsector: two vacancies arose because two members, namely, Alan Leong Kah-kit and Ronny Tong Ka-wah, both having been elected as LegCo members, were deemed to have resigned from the Election Committee on 8 October 2004; 
 Religious Subsector: six vacancies arose because five members, namely, Tong Kwok-wah, Chiu Chung-tong, David Chu Chor-sing, Ku Sze-chung and Yau Fu-hong had died; and a member, Rubbya Hassan had resigned from the Election Committee; and 
 Textiles and Garment Subsector: one vacancy arose because a member, Lee Chung-chiu had died.

Nominations
The six empty seats in the religious sector were nominated by the religious councils. Harry Ha Kay-wai from the Chinese Muslim Cultural and Fraternal Association, Thomas Soo Yee-po from the Hong Kong Christian Council, Tong Wai-ki, Cheung Kam-hung and Lo Wai-kon from the Hong Kong Taoist Association, and Wu Tai-chow from the Confucian Academy duly nominated as the members of the Election Committee Religious Subsector.

The nominations for the other 25 seats from the regular subsectors were accepted over a one-week timeframe from 9 April to 15 April. 12 candidates in 7 subsectors were elected uncontested.

Results

Contested elections

Uncontested elections

See also
 2005 Hong Kong Chief Executive election

References

2005
2005 elections in China
E
May 2005 events in China